Choyang T'an'gwang station (Choyang Colliery station) is a railway station in Choyang-dong, Kaech'ŏn municipal city, South P'yŏngan province, North Korea. It is the terminus of the Choyang Colliery Line of the Korean State Railway.

History

The station was opened on 13 May 1916 by the Mitsui Mining Railway, which became the Kaech'ŏn Light Railway  in 1927; the Kaech'ŏn Light Railway was subsequently taken over by the Chosen Government Railway on 1 November 1932.

References

Railway stations in North Korea